Paapa Kwaakye Essiedu (born 11 June 1990) is an English actor. For his performance in the miniseries I May Destroy You (2020), he received Primetime Emmy and British Academy Television Award nominations. He won the 2016 Ian Charleson Award for his roles in the Royal Shakespeare Company productions of Hamlet and King Lear.

Early life 
Born at Guy's Hospital in Southwark, Essiedu grew up in Walthamstow, East London with his mother, a fashion and design teacher. His family is from Ghana, where he has a half-brother and sister. He attended Forest School on a scholarship. Active in sports teams and theatrical productions, while growing up he wanted to be a doctor. Essiedu developed an interest in Shakespeare and was accepted to the Guildhall School of Music and Drama, where he met and worked with Michaela Coel. His favourite actors include Mark Rylance, Chiwetel Ejiofor, Simon Russell Beale, David Thewlis, and Gary Oldman.

Career

Theatre
Essiedu joined the Royal Shakespeare Company (RSC) in 2012 to play Fenton in Phillip Breen's production of The Merry Wives of Windsor. Afterwards, he joined the National Theatre, playing Burgundy and understudying Edmund in Sam Mendes’ production of King Lear. When Sam Troughton lost his voice during a performance, Essiedu stepped in and played the role to critical acclaim. He appeared in Outside on the Street (Pleasance Theatre), Black Jesus (Finborough Theatre), Romeo and Juliet (Tobacco Factory), You For Me For You (Royal Court).

In 2016, Essiedu starred in the Royal Shakespeare Company productions of Hamlet as the titular role and King Lear as Edmund. The judges described Essiedu's Hamlet as one the audience listened to "completely still", observing Essiedu's performance could turn on a sixpence – sweet, playful and flirtatious one minute, and fiercely intelligent the next. "Like all great actors", a judge commented, he "made all the lines his own". His Edmund in King Lear was reported to convey a chilling contempt and cynicism. In 2022, Essiedu returned to the theatre in A Number at The Old Vic, with Lennie James.

Television and film
Essiedu began his television career with roles as Demetrius in Russell T Davies' television film adaptation of A Midsummer Night's Dream, Otto in the period drama miniseries The Miniaturist, Nate Akindele in the Channel 4 miniseries Kiri, and Ed Washburn in the BBC One drama Press.

In 2020, Essiedu starred as Alex Dumani in the Sky Atlantic crime drama Gangs of London and Kwame in the BBC One series I May Destroy You. For the latter, Essiedu received critical acclaim, a number of notable nominations, and won Best Ensemble alongside the rest of the cast at the 36th Independent Spirit Awards. He then played George Boleyn, 2nd Viscount Rochford in the 3-parter Anne Boleyn for Channel 5 in 2021.

In 2022, Essiedu began starring in the Sky Max science fiction time loop series The Lazarus Project. He also appeared in Alex Garland's Men and joined the cast of The Capture on BBC One for its second series as Isaac Turner, Security Minister and MP for Hazlemere South.

Audio
Paapa voiced Tunde in the BBC Radio 3 drama As Innocent As You Can Get (2016) by Rex Obano, and in the BBC Radio 4 drama Wide Open Spaces the same year, in which he played the role of a man determined to overcome his agoraphobia in order to keep his promise to visit his daughter's grave on the first anniversary of her death.

Filmography

Film

Television

Stage

Accolades

References

External links
 

1990 births
Living people
21st-century English male actors
Male actors from London
Alumni of the Guildhall School of Music and Drama
Black British male actors
English male Shakespearean actors
English male stage actors
English male television actors
English people of Ghanaian descent
People educated at Forest School, Walthamstow
People from Southwark
People from Walthamstow